Jeejeebhoy Piroshaw Bomanjee Jeejeebhoy (9 November 1891, Mumbai, India–9 April 1950, Harlow, Essex) was the first Indian military pilot, briefly serving in the Royal Flying Corps during World War I.

Born into a minor aristocratic Parsi family, Jeejeebhoy was elected a Fellow of the Royal Geographical Society in 1912. Generally, the Indian Army officers who fought as pilots during World War I were of European rather than Indian descent. Before WWI it was the policy of the War Office to deny commissions to applicants not of pure European descent on the grounds that "a British private will never follow a half-caste or native officer." However, a shortage of pilots resulted in a change in policy and a handful of Indian military pilots served during that war as officers of the Royal Flying Corps and later the Royal Air Force, rather than as officers of the Indian Army. Jeejeebhoy held an FAI accredited Aviator Certificate while undergoing training with the RFC. He completed his flying training at Stinson School at San Antonio, Texas on 2 May 1916 and held American Aviator certificate #495.

The first of five Indian military pilots, on 6 November 1916 Jeejeebhoy was promoted to temporary Honorary 2nd Lieutenant in the Royal Flying Corps on the General List. However, Lieutenant Jeejeebhoy’s active career with the RFC was brief as his papers in The National Archives show that he fell ill in January 1917 while training at the RFC's Oxford School of Instruction and he was suspended from training to convalesce. In May 1917 a medical board decided that he was permanently unfit for further service, and an entry in The London Gazette of 29 May 1917 announced that "Temp Hon 2nd Lt Jeejeebhoy Piroshaw Bomanjee Jeejeebhoy relinquishes his commission on account of ill health". He was given an honorary commission of 2/Lt at the time of discharge. In 1920 he was given an honorary commission as Captain and may have served in the Air Ministry of the British government in the early 1920s.

Jeejeebhoy died in 1950 aged 58 and is buried in the Parsi section of Brookwood Cemetery, Surrey.

References

External links
Record of 2/Lieutenant Jeejeebhoy RFC in The National Archives

1891 births
1950 deaths
Fellows of the Royal Geographical Society
Royal Flying Corps officers
Indian military personnel of World War I
Parsi people from Mumbai
Military personnel from Mumbai
Indian aviators
Burials at Brookwood Cemetery
Parsi people